No. 652 Squadron RAF was a unit of the Royal Air Force during the Second World War and afterwards in Germany.
Numbers 651 to 663 Squadrons of the RAF were Air Observation Post units working closely with Army units in artillery spotting and liaison. A further three of these squadrons, 664, 665 and 666, were AOP units of the Royal Canadian Air Force manned by Canadian and British personnel. Their duties and squadron numbers were transferred to the Army with the formation of the Army Air Corps on 1 September 1957.

History

Formation and World War II
No. 652 Squadron was formed at RAF Old Sarum, Wiltshire, on 1 May 1942 and went into action in Normandy on 7 June 1944 in support of the British Second Army and the Operation Overlord landings. Most of its pilots and observers came from the British Army, while maintenance was carried out by RAF personnel. The squadron moved with the Second Army through France, Belgium and the Netherlands into Germany.

Claim to fame
'C' Flight, No. 652 Squadron RAF has been credited with firing the last British shots of the war in Europe while directing artillery fire at the siege of Dunkirk on 7 May 1945, sharing in this action with No. 665 Squadron RCAF.

Post war service
After the German surrender it remained as part of the British Air Forces of Occupation, later of the 2nd Tactical Air Force.

No. 1902 Air Observation Post Flight was formed within 652 Squadron previously 'A' Flight also No. 1903 Air Observation Post Flight which was formed within 652 Squadron previously 'B' Flight
No. 1904 Air Observation Post Flight was formed within 652 Squadron previously 'C' Flight
No. 1905 Air Observation Post Flight was formed within 652 Squadron

The unit was disbanded during September 1957, when it was merged into the Army Air Corps. It will be a Lynx Wildcat OCU Squadron in the future.

The original squadron is represented today by 652 Squadron of 1 Regiment, Army Air Corps

Aircraft operated

Squadron bases

See also
 List of Royal Air Force aircraft squadrons
 Army Air Corps (United Kingdom)

References

Notes

Bibliography

External links

 Squadron histories for nos. 651–670 squadron on RAFWeb
 Elite UK Forces

652 Squadron
Aircraft squadrons of the Royal Air Force in World War II
Military units and formations established in 1942
Military units and formations disestablished in 1957